Kaka may refer to:

People

Nickname or given name

Sports
 Kaká (born 1982), Ricardo Izecson dos Santos Leite, Brazilian football attacking midfielder
 Kazimierz Deyna (1947–1989), Polish football attacking midfielder sometimes known as Kaka
 Kaká (futsal player) (born 1987), Carlos Augusto dos Santos da Silva, Italian futsal pivot
 Kaká (footballer, born 1981), Claudiano Bezerra da Silva, Brazilian football centre-back
 Kaká (footballer, born January 1991), David Leonel Faleiro, Brazilian football midfielder
 Kaká (footballer, born May 1991), Everton Ferreira Guimarães, Brazilian football attacking midfielder for Gokulam Kerala
 Káká (Portuguese footballer) (born 1992), Carlos Eduardo Ferreira Batista, Portuguese football left-back for União Leiria
 Kaká (footballer, born 1999), Andressa Karolaine Freire Gomes, Brazilian football centre-back for Santos

Others
 Kaka Bag-ao (born 1969), Filipino human rights lawyer, agrarian reform advocate and politician
 Joseph Baptista (1864–1930), Indian politician from Mumbai
 Kaka Kalelkar (1895-1981), Indian independence activist, social reformer and journalist
 Rajesh Khanna (1942–2012), Bollywood actor, film producer and politician
 Randeep Singh Nabha, Indian politician
 Kaka Radhakrishnan (c. 1925–2012), Indian film actor
 Kaka Joginder Singh (1918–1998), Punjabi politician
 Kaká Werá (born 1964), Brazilian writer and politician
 Kaka Mallam Yale (born 1953), Nigerian politician

Pen name or stage name
 Kaka (singer) (born 1991), Danish reggae, dancehall singer of Tanzanian origin
 Kaka (punjabi singer) Indian punjabi singer and lyricist
 Kaka Hathrasi, pen name of Hindi satirist Prabhu Lal Garg (1906–1995)
 Shrinivas Khale (1926-2011), Indian composer and music director also known as Khale Kaka
 Kaka Sungura, stage name of Kenyan rapper Kevin Onimba (born 1987)

Surname
 Gillies Kaka (born 1990), New Zealand rugby union player
 Moussa Kaka, Nigerien radio journalist
 Sefiu Adegbenga Kaka (born 1952), Nigerian politician

Places
 Kaka, Central African Republic, a village
 Kaka, Golestan, a village in Golestan Province, Iran
 Kaka, Zanjan, a village in Zanjan Province, Iran
 Sofara (Kaka in the Fula language), a town in Mali
 Kaka, Togo, a village
 Kaka District, Turkmenistan
 Kaka, Turkmenistan, a town and district capital
 Kaka, Arizona, United States, a census-designated place
 Kaka River, Bolivia
 Kaka Nunatak, a nunatak on Ross Island, Antarctica

Other uses
 Kākā, a native New Zealand parrot
 KAKA (FM), a radio station licensed to serve Salina, Kansas, United States
 KXSA-FM, a radio station licensed to serve Dermott, Arkansas, United States, which held the call sign KAKA-FM from 1984 to 1986; see List of radio stations in Arkansas
 KAKA (AM), a defunct radio station in Wickenburg, Arizona; see List of radio stations in Arizona
 Kaka, a dialect of the Manenguba language of Cameroon
 Kaka (film), a 2021 Philippine erotic comedy film

See also 
 Norfolk kaka, an extinct parrot
 Chatham kaka, an extinct parrot
 Kaka Point, New Zealand, a settlement
 Caca (disambiguation)